OKKO is the network of filling complexes (gas stations) in Ukraine. The owner of OKKO network is open joint-stock company Galnaftogaz.

First OKKO filling station was opened in 1999 in Stryi, Lviv Oblast, and the first large OKKO filling station with a large shop, cafe and portal autowashing began to operate in Lviv since 2000.

As of 2019 OKKO network consists of 400 modern filling stations throughout unoccupied Ukraine. The company also has 2 OKKO river filling stations – in Kyiv and Dnipro, and one OKKO Compressed natural gas station within the network. The OKKO group has number of own food chains like "A la minute" (fast serving of European cuisine), "Pasta Mia" (Italian cuisine), "Meiwei" (Pan-Asian cuisine).

In August 2018 the Security Service of Ukraine searched several offices of the company in Kyiv and Lviv under suspicion in financing pseudo-governments in Eastern Ukraine, the main shareholder of the company Vitalii Antonov denied any of the accusations stating that the company is not involved in any kind of operations that it is being investigated for and lost 8% of it assets ($80 million) when Donbas and Crimea were occupied by Russia. In May 2019 the company was fined by the Anti-Monopoly Committee of Ukraine for price collusion along with WOG and SOCAR.

History

The first OKKO filling station was opened in 1999 in Stryi, Lviv Oblast, and the first large OKKO filling station with a large shop, cafe and portal autowashing began to operate in Lviv in 2000. While OKKO brand appeared in 1999, it was created based on several smaller oil and gas enterprises in Zakarpattia and Prykarpattia with the first company "Ivano-Frankivsknaftoproduct" established on 31 August 1993. By late 1990s the control packages of stock in those organizations was obtained by the Financial and Investment Energy Holding (FIEH) uniting them under one brand.

Since 2002, 55 filling station are operating within the OKKO network and the first OKKO branded filling station was opened in the capital city.

In 2006 first two large OKKO route complexes – in Kalynivka village near Kyiv and in Chop in Zakarpattya region – were opened. OKKO filling complex in Chop entered the Ukrainian book of records as the biggest filling complex in Ukraine by area and by the amount of services. That same year, the first mobile laboratory for fuel quality control began operating in the network.

In 2007, the first OKKO gas compressor station started operating in Burshtyn, Ivano-Frankivska region.  The first A la minute branded fast food restaurant was opened at OKKO filling station in Skole, Lviv region. The new premium fuel Pulls 95 was launched into the market.  The company’s market share increased to 7.1 per cent – the third result in Ukraine.

2008 : Concern Galnaftogaz joined Go Green Declaration of UN Global Compact. The principles of ‘green office’ were being introduced in the Company. This same year it was decided to implement the principles of Accessibility Program (wheelchair accessibility to retail facilities) in all newly constructed and renovated OKKO filling stations.

2009 : FISHKA first national loyalty coalition program was launched. First ‘Tobi’ branded stores were opened at OKKO filling stations in Lviv. OKKO took 9.3 per cent of the retail market of petroleum products in Ukraine. Since 2009, European Bank for Reconstructions and Development (EBRD) became one of the Company’s shareholders.
  
2010: The new premium diesel Pulls diesel was launched into the market.

2011: The first Pasta Mia branded Italian restaurant was opened at OKKO filling station in Donetsk region.  OKKO filling station network is operating in all 24 regions of Ukraine and in Crimea. OKKO’s share of the retail market of petroleum products in Ukraine is 13.6 per cent.

2012: OKKO filling station network operate with more than 360 filling stations. The company strengthened its position in the eastern and southern regions of Ukraine. It began a major redesign of filling stations. The first device for charging electric vehicles was introduced at OKKO filling station in Kyiv.  Vitaliy Antonov, President  of Concern Galnaftogaz, headed the list of top managers Ukrainian companies for the oil industry published by ‘Top 100’ magazine and was recognized as one of the two top managers in the category ‘Seller and Marketer’.

By 2013, OKKO filling station network  increased the number of branded filling  stations by more than 10 per cent  and its market share - to over 15 per cent.  The company's plans are to increase its market share by 1-2 per cent and the number of filling stations up to 550 objects by the end of 2016.

During 2014, OKKO filling station network opened 13 filling stations and another 19 were reconstructed in accordance with the requirements of modern design and format of the Company. 34 charging stations for electric vehicles OKKO Charge were opened at OKKO filling stations. New online processing of OKKO fuel cards maintenance was implemented.

Types of branded fuel 
Pulls 95 – new generation fuel, which is sold at OKKO filling stations. 
In autumn 2010, the Company started to supply Pulls Diesel branded diesel fuel, which meets the standards of ISO 4840: 2007 «High quality diesel fuel" and EN 590: 2004 environmental Euro 5.

This fuel originate from:
 ORLEN LIETUVA (Mazeikiai, Lithuania)
 ORLEN (Poland)
 MOZYR OIL REFINERY (Belarus)
 NAFTAN (Belarus)

Loyalty coalition program
Since 2009, OKKO filling station network is using FISHKA loyalty program, the essence of which is that customers accumulate points for purchased goods and services, and can exchange these points for rewards. In 2013 FISHKA loyalty program became national coalition program. Now, FISHKA first national coalition program includes Raiffeisen Bank Aval, the network of Furshet branded supermarkets, the network of Allo and Mobilochka digital stores, Universalna insurance company and Shypshyna online store.

In 2013, a project on co-brand Visa FISHKA cards, exclusive international payment cards of Raiffeisen Bank Aval, was realized. It combines banking payment card and ordinary FISHKA card with contactless payment technology of Visa payWave. In this regard, the Company started installation of bank terminals serving contactless cards of different payment systems at OKKO filling stations.

Overall, at the end of 2013 FISHKA card served over 1,400 outlets throughout Ukraine. The number of registered FISHKA card users increased to 1 985 639.

Related brands
A la minute, Pasta mia, Hot-café. This is the largest network of on the road restaurants that include 32 A la minute, 7 Pasta Mia and almost 400 Hot café branded restaurants. Brand Hot café - is a chain of coffee shops and coffee places at OKKO filling stations.

Tobi.  Tobi branded goods stores are operating at OKKO filling stations in "OCC" and also in the cities of Vinnytsia and Lviv region, under this brand some products are produced for OKKO filling station network - drinking water, beverages, energy drinks, ice teas and more.

TFC. TFC fuel quality testing centre includes 8 fixed, 4 district and 3 mobile laboratories performing fuel and lubricants quality control for OKKO filling station network.

Achievements

OKKO filling complex in Chop claims to be the biggest filling complex in Ukraine by area and by the amount of services.

In 2009 OKKO filling station in Inkerman (Crimea) became the largest filling station by area in Ukraine (3.3 hectares). This is due to the fact that the complex, in addition to fuel-distributing columns, has LPG and compressed gas refuelling  modules.

References

External links
 Official website

Companies based in Lviv
Privately held companies based in Lviv Oblast
Privately held companies in Ukraine
Economy of Lviv Oblast
Convenience stores of Ukraine
Ukrainian companies established in 1999
Filling stations in Ukraine